The year 566 BC was a year of the pre-Julian Roman calendar. In the Roman Empire, it was known as year 188 Ab urbe condita. The denomination 566 BC for this year has been used since the early medieval period, when the Anno Domini calendar era became the prevalent method in Europe for naming years.

Events

By place

Athens 
The first known Panathenaic Games of Ancient Greece are conducted in Athens.

India 
Vardhamana attained True Knowledge and became Mahavira.

Births 
 Zerubbabel, Jewish leader.

Deaths

References